"Faint" is a song by American rock band Linkin Park from their second studio album, Meteora. The song was released as the album's second single on June 9, 2003, and is the seventh track. It entered the top thirty on the majority of the charts it appeared on. On the Hot 100, it peaked at #48. The song reached #1 on the US Modern Rock Tracks, becoming the band's third number-one hit on the chart. The song would later be featured on the group's mashup EP with Jay-Z, Collision Course, where it was mashed up with lyrics of the song Jigga What from Vol. 2... Hard Knock Life.

American metalcore bands I, the Breather and Memphis May Fire recorded a cover of "Faint", as well as Japanese metalcore band Crossfaith featuring Masato Hayakawa from the post-hardcore band, Coldrain. "Faint" is considered one of Linkin Park's most iconic and most covered songs, with its intro and primary guitar riff being widely recognizable.

Overview
This song was released as two singles, "Faint 1" and "Faint 2." They differed in cover color and track listing ("Faint 1" is blue, and "Faint 2" is a brownish-green mixture). "Faint 1" was also released as a Canadian version that includes the tracks, but does not include the music video. "Faint 1" lists the length of "Lying from You" as 3:43 but is actually 3:04. "One Step Closer", on "Faint 2", is 3:43 long. A promotional sampler was given to members of the street team and some members of the LPU, the band's official fan club. A demo for the song can be found on the Underground 9.0 Fan Club release. It features Mike Shinoda rapping with different lyrics, with only some backing input from Chester Bennington. A live version of the track was featured as a b-side for "What I've Done".

The success of this single, and the success of Linkin Park's "Numb/Encore" mashup with Jay-Z, led MTV to produce a mashup of "Faint" with "Toxic" by Britney Spears. This was done by DJ Rob Boskamp and can be found on MTV's MTV Mash Up - Amazing Remixes! CD.

During the Minutes to Midnight World Tour, they extended the length of the song during live performances, playing the riff from the bridge while Delson played a solo. In some live performances during Living Things World Tour, it is played after "Tinfoil" as the opening song on the setlist.

Music video
The video, directed by Mark Romanek and shot in downtown Los Angeles, consists of the band performing in front of an audience and a floodlight. The audience consisted of members from the LPU. Almost the entire video is shot from behind the band, allowing the strong lighting to portray them in silhouettes. Therefore, the faces of the band are not shown throughout most of the video, except at the final chorus where the band is then shown from the front.
They perform in front of a derelict building structure with graffiti, such as a monstrous version of the Hybrid Theory Soldier and some Linkin Park symbols.

A director's cut was made that features an extended ending where Mike Shinoda spray paints the words En Proceso (Spanish for In Process) on a garage door.

As of January 2023, the music video for "Faint" has over 375 million views on YouTube.

Commercial performance
"Faint" was officially released to US radio on July 1, 2003. The song reached the top twenty on the Hot 100 Recurrent Airplay, and the following week it debuted on the Hot 100, the official US chart. "Faint" peaked at number forty-eight in its eighth week and remained on the chart until its twentieth week. The song entered the top twenty on the majority of the Billboard charts on which it appeared. "Faint" proved popular on Modern Rock Tracks radio, attaining the number one position on that chart for six weeks (with 37 weeks on the chart), and peaked at number forty-eight on the Hot 100 Airplay format and number two for two weeks on the US Mainstream Rock Tracks.

"Faint" reached the top thirty on the Canadian Singles Chart where it peaked at 21.

The song was released in Australia, Europe and New Zealand on July 22, 2003. "Somewhere I Belong" reached the UK top ten, while "Faint" reached the top twenty. "Faint" continued the trend of lower-charting singles when it debuted and peaked at number fifteen, and remained in the chart for 8 weeks. "Faint" peaked at number twenty-five on the Australian Singles Chart and stayed at its peak for two weeks.

"Faint" reached 67 on the Japanese singles chart and 48 on the Eurochart Hot 100 Singles and it would also peak at forty in seven countries and reached the top twenty in the United Kingdom and Spain. It was a moderate top ten success on the LAUNCH Music Videos Top 100.

To date, It has been less successful than its predecessor "Somewhere I Belong" and the following single "Numb" where both singles charted higher. However, it has peaked higher than "Numb" in the Belgium Singles Chart (#44) and Italian Singles Chart. Additionally, it was more successful on the Mainstream Rock Track and the Modern Rock Track chart than the other singles  from Meteora. It was the 8th Best performing song of the decade on the Modern Rock Track chart, and the 13th best performing song of the decade on the Mainstream rock Track Chart. It is their second most successful single behind "In the End" on the rock charts. Moreover, the single peaked at #15 in the UK, charting for 8 weeks, being their second-most successful song from Meteora in the UK after "Somewhere I Belong".

Track listing

Personnel
Linkin Park
 Chester Bennington – vocals
 Mike Shinoda – strings arrangement, rap vocals, rhythm guitar, sampler
 Brad Delson – lead guitar
 Dave "Phoenix" Farrell – bass guitar
 Joe Hahn – turntables, samplers, synthesizers
 Rob Bourdon – drums
Additional musicians
 Joel Derouin, Charlie Bisharat, Alyssa Park, Sara Parkins, Michelle Richards, Mark Robertson – violins
 Evan Wilson, Bob Becker – violas
 Larry Corbett, Dan Smith – cellos
 David Campbell – strings arrangement

Charts

Weekly charts

Certifications

References

External links
 Faint official lyrics

Linkin Park songs
2003 singles
2003 songs
Music videos directed by Mark Romanek
Protest songs
Songs written by Mike Shinoda
Warner Records singles
American pop rock songs